Butuan also called the Butan Rajanate and the Kingdom of Butuan was a precolonial Philippine polity centred on the northern Mindanao island in the modern city of Butuan in what is now the southern Philippines. It was known for its mining of gold, its gold products and its extensive trade network across the Nusantara area. The kingdom had trading relationships with the ancient civilizations of Japan, China, India, Indonesia, Persia, Cambodia and areas now comprised in Thailand.

The balangay (large outrigger boats) that have been found along the east and west banks of the Libertad river (old Agusan River) have revealed much about Butuan's history. As a result, Butuan is considered to have been a major trading port in the Caraga region during the pre-colonial era.

Historiography

Chinese records

Evidence indicates that Butuan was in contact with the Song dynasty of China by at least 1001 AD. The Chinese annal Song Shih recorded the first appearance of a Butuan tributary mission (Lijehan  and Jiaminan) at the Chinese Imperial Court on March 17, 1001, AD. Chinese Annals described Butuan as a Hindu kingdom with a Buddhist monarchy. The chief (or "king") of Butuan named Kiling sent an envoy under I-hsu-han, with a formal memorial requesting equal status in court protocol with the Champa envoy. Researcher Eric Casino, believes the name Kiling is not Visayan in origin but rather, Indian, because Kiling refers to the people of India. The Sejarah Melayu (Malay Annals) of the nearby country of Malaysia, refers to the similarly worded Keling as immigrant people from India. Rajah Kiling's request for diplomatic equality in protocol towards his Rajahnate, was later denied by the Chinese Imperial court, mainly because of favoritism over the Champa civilization.

A new rajah with the Indianized name Sri Bata Shaja later succeeded in attaining diplomatic equality with Champa by sending the flamboyant ambassador Likanhsieh. Likanhsieh shocked the Emperor Zhenzong by presenting a memorial engraved on a gold tablet, some white dragon camphor, Moluccan cloves, and a South Sea slave at the eve of an important ceremonial state sacrifice. This display of irreverence sparked interests from China over the polity and the diplomatic relations between the two polities reached its peak during the Yuan dynasty. Later In the 1300s the Chinese annals, Nanhai zhi, reported that Brunei invaded or administered the Philippine kingdoms of Butuan, Sulu and Ma-i (Mindoro) which would regain their independence at a later date. The then Hindu state of Sulu which was founded by Visayan immigrants from Butuan and Surigao to the Sulu Archipelago, after simultaneously regaining their independence together with their Butuanon cousins, avenged the invasion of their kingdoms by counter-invading Pon-i (Brunei) and stealing 2 Sacred Pearls from Pon-i's Rajah. Chinese records about the polity stopped after the reign of Rajah Siagu, the last independent Rajah of Butuan. He was formally subjugated into the Spanish Empire after he and his brother, Rajah Kolambu of Limasawa, made a blood compact with Ferdinand Magellan in 1521.

Excavated artifacts

Numerous jars have been found in the Butuan area that indicate the wealth of the kingdom and the existence of foreign traditions. Some of these jars have been dated as follows:

 Sathing Phra (900–1100 AD)
 Haripunjaya (800–900 AD)
Japanese (12th to 16th centuries AD)
 Song dynasty (1001–1271)
 Yuan dynasty (1271–1368)
 Ming dynasty (1368–1521)
 Khmer Empire (802–900 AD)
 Sukhothai Kingdom (1300–1400)
 Champa (1000–1200)
 Persian (9th to 10th centuries AD)

Artifacts have been recovered from within the vicinities of Ambangan Archeological Site in Libertad that attest to the historical accounts that Butuan traded with India, Japan, Han Chinese, and Southeast Asian countries during these periods.

Origins of the name

The name Butuan is believed to have existed long before the Spanish conquistadores arrived in the Philippine archipelago. One possible indication of this is a rhinoceros ivory seal with design carved in ancient Javanese or early Kawi script (used around the 10th century CE) which, according to a Dutch scholar, was deciphered as But-wan. Another account suggests the name derives from the word batuan, a mangosteen-related fruit common in Mindanao. Another alternative is that the name derives from Datu Bantuan, possibly a former datu of the region.

Recorded monarchs

Modern commentary
Spanish chroniclers, when they set foot on Butuan, remarked that gold was so abundant that even houses were decorated with gold; "Pieces of gold, the size of walnuts and eggs are found by sifting the earth in the island of that king who came to our ships. All the dishes of that king are of gold and also some portion of his house as we were told by that king himself... He had a covering of silk on his head, and wore two large golden earrings fastened in his ears... At his side hung a dagger, the haft of which was somewhat long and all of gold, and its scabbard of carved wood. He had three spots of gold on every tooth, and his teeth appeared as if bound with gold." As written by Antonio Pigafetta on Rajah Siagu of Butuan during Magellan's voyage. Rajah Siagu was also a cousin of Rajah Humabon of the Cebu Rajahnate, thus suggesting that the two Indianized kingdoms were in an alliance together with Hindu Kutai against the Islamic Sultanates of Maguindanao and Sulu.

Ancient Butuan used gold in religious images and royal items like crowns, headbands, necklaces, sashes, waistbands, ear ornaments, and bracelets. It was also used in funerals as death masks, and as a cover for the dead person's eyes, nose, and mouth.

Butuan was so rich in treasures that a museum curator, Florina H. Capistrano-Baker, stated that it was even richer than the more well-known western maritime kingdom of Srivijaya; "The astonishing quantities and impressive quality of gold treasures recovered in Butuan suggest that its flourishing port settlement played an until recently little-recognized role in early Southeast Asian trade. Surprisingly, the amount of gold discovered in Butuan far exceeds that found in Sumatra, where the much better known flourishing kingdom of Srivijaya is said to have been located."

See also

Butuan
Balangay
Dimasaua
Agusan image
Butuanon people
Indian cultural influences in early Philippine polities

References

External links

 Butuan silver strips
 Flag and symbols
 Butuan ivory seals

Former countries in Philippine history
Barangay states
Historical regions
History of the Philippines (900–1565)
History of Mindanao
History of Agusan del Norte
Kingdom of Butuan
Historical Hindu kingdoms